Ashley John Warburton Chesters (born 25 August 1989) is an English professional golfer.

Amateur career
Chesters won the European Amateur in 2014 and 2015, the first golfer to win it twice. These wins qualified him for the 2014 and 2015 Open Championships. In 2014 he scored 70 and 77 to miss the cut by one stroke. In 2015 Chesters scored 71 and 72 to make the cut and then scored 67 and 69 to finished tied for 12th place.

In 2014 Chesters played in the Bonallack Trophy, the St Andrews Trophy and the Eisenhower Trophy. He played in the 2015 Walker Cup at Royal Lytham & St Annes Golf Club, scoring 3½ points in a Great Britain and Ireland team that won 16½–9½.

Professional career
Chesters turned professional after the 2015 Walker Cup. In 2016 he played on the Challenge Tour. He finished tied for 16th place in the 2016 European Tour Qualifying School to earn his place on the 2017 European Tour.

Since joining the European Tour in 2017 his best finish has been 4th place in the 2018 Andalucia Valderrama Masters.

Amateur wins
 2011 Lee Westwood Trophy
 2013 European Amateur
 2014 European Amateur

Source:

Results in major championships

CUT = missed the half-way cut
"T" = tied
NT = No tournament due to the COVID-19 pandemic
Note: Chesters only played in The Open Championship.

Team appearances
Amateur
 European Amateur Team Championship (representing England): 2014, 2015
Bonallack Trophy (representing Europe): 2014 (winners)
 St Andrews Trophy (representing Great Britain & Ireland): 2014 (winners)
 Eisenhower Trophy (representing England): 2014
 Walker Cup (representing Great Britain & Ireland): 2015 (winners)

See also
2016 European Tour Qualifying School graduates

References

External links

English male golfers
European Tour golfers
Sportspeople from Shrewsbury
1989 births
Living people